"How Wonderful You Are" is a song by Gordon Haskell. It was released as a single in the Christmas period of 2001 after mass promotion by BBC Radio 2 where it became a favourite of listeners after being featured by the drive-time presenter Johnnie Walker. It was the UK Christmas number-two in 2001 behind Robbie Williams and Nicole Kidman's  cover of "Somethin' Stupid". The song is the most requested song of all time at Radio 2.

The song was covered in Finnish by Kirka for his album  Sinut Siinä Nään in 2002.  A mix version was released by Larry Peace in 2017. Haskell re-recorded the song in a samba version for his 2020 album The Cat Who's Got the Cream, featuring jazz trumpeter Guy Barker.

Charts

Weekly charts

Year-end charts

Certifications

References

2001 singles
2001 songs
UK Independent Singles Chart number-one singles